The European Centre for Allergy Research Foundation (ECARF) is a non-profit foundation in the area of allergology.

Foundation structure 
It was founded by Jørgen Philip-Sørensen in 2003 and later became a foundation with legal capacity. A board with four members manages the foundation. The chairperson of the foundation is Torsten Zuberbier.

Purpose 
The foundation's self-described goals are to increase knowledge about allergies, to carry out allergy research and to increase awareness of allergies in Europe. As a result, the physical and psychological strain on patients as well as the financial strain on society as a whole should be reduced.

Activities and fields of work 
ECARF
 supports structured research in allergology, i.e. through the creation of a multi-area research platform
 promotes high standards of quality in the teaching and training of medical personnel and offers international training courses for doctors
 carries out active public relations work to increase awareness and knowledge of allergies among the general population. In patient training sessions, those affected by allergies learn how to deal with their illness and improve their quality of life
 promotes the Allergie-Centrum-Charité; enables research and specific consultation-hours for patients there.
 awards the ECARF Quality Seal to allergy-friendly products and services
 offers an allergology curriculum for international guest doctors
 promotes and integrates a European network in the area of allergology

Network 
ECARF works in close collaboration with the following organisations:
 ARIA, Allergic Rhinitis and its Impact on Asthma
 GA²LEN, Global Allergy and Asthma European Network
 GARD, Global Alliance against Respiratory Diseases
 Stiftung PID, Deutscher Polleninformationsdienst German Pollen Information Service
 UNEV, Urticaria Network e. V.
 ANEV, Autoinflammation Network e.V.
 ARC², Autoinflammation Reference Center Charité

Sources 
 Website Allergie-Centrum-Charité
 Website Department of Dermatology, Venerology and Allergology / Allergie-Centrum-Charité - Charité-Universitätsmedizin Berlin
 Website Torsten Zuberbier, Head of the Foundation

Research institutes established in 2003
Allergy organizations
European medical and health organizations
International organisations based in Germany